Santa Ana is a municipality in the Honduran department of Francisco Morazán.

The location of the crash of Central American Airways Flight 731 was El Espino in Santa Ana.

References

Municipalities of the Francisco Morazán Department